The 2018 Iowa House of Representative elections took place on November 6, 2018, to elect representatives from all 100 districts. The winners of this will serve in 88th General Assembly, with apportioned among the states based on 2010 United States Census. The Republican Party retained control of the House, while losing a net gain of 5 seats to Democratic Party.

The elections for Iowa's 4 Congressional Districts, Governor and Lieutenant Governor, Statewide Office Holders and the Iowa Senate were also held on this date.

General election

District 1

District 2

District 3

District 4

District 5

District 6

District 7

District 8

District 9 
Incumbent Democrat Helen Miller announced her retirement and did not run for reelection Republicans Ann Meyer, a Registered Nurse and Gary Waechter are running are running. Democrat Megan Srinivas, a Physician announced her candidacy  

The Primary Election was held on June 5, 2018

District 10 
Republican Incumbent Mike Sexton is seeking reelection for a third term. he faced former 2012 and 2016 Presidential Candidate Tom Hoefling in the republican primary. on the Democratic Side, Jake Thompson is running for the democratic nomination.

Republican PrimaryDemocratic Primary

Thompson faced no primary challenge

District 11 
Incumbent Republican Gary Worthan is running unopposed

District 12 
Republican Brian Best is running for a third term, He faced democrat Peter Leo in the general election

District 13 
Incumbent Democrat Chris Hall is Running for fifth term and ran unopposed

District 14 
Incumbent Democrat Timothy Kacena is fending off a rematch against Republican Robert Henderson, who Kacena narrowly defeated back in 2016.

District 15 
Incumbent Democrat Charlie McConkey is running for reelection he faces Republican LeAnn Hughes in the General Election

District 16 
Democrat Steve Gorman nearly pulled off a stunning upset against Republican Incumbent  Mary Ann Hanusa. Libertarian Party Candidate Steve Sechrest is also running

District 17 
Republican Incumbent Matt Windschitl and Democratic Jan Creasman are having a rematch

District 18 
Steven Holt ran unopposed in general election

District 19 
House Majority leader Chris Hagenow who previously represented District 43 planned to move with his family to run in the 19th District  Democrat Gregg Gustafson and Independent Candidate Richard Dedor are also running.

District 20

District 21

District 22

District 23

District 24

District 25

District 26

District 27

District 28 
Incumbent Greg Heartsill is not seeking reelection

Democratic Primary

Democrats Ann Fields and Zachary Pendroy are both running 
Republican Primary

Jon Thorup and Jon Van Wyk are both vying for this seat.

District 29

District 30

District 31

District 32

District 33

District 34

District 35

District 36

District 37

District 38

District 39

District 40

District 41

District 42 
Kristin Sunde is Challenging Republican Incumbent Peter Cownie in a key West Des Moines suburban seat.

District 43

District 44

References

External links 
 

Iowa House of Representatives elections
House of Representatives
Iowa House of Representatives